William Fiero Russell (January 14, 1812 – April 29, 1896) was an American banker who served one term as a U.S. Representative from New York from 1857 to 1859.

Biography
He was born in Saugerties, New York on January 14, 1812, to Jeremiah Russell.  He completed preparatory studies, and then became active in several businesses, often ventures in which his father also had an interest.

He was the founder and president of the Saugerties Bank.  He served as postmaster of Saugerties from October 19, 1836, to January 25, 1841.  Russell was a member of the New York State Assembly (Ulster Co., 1st D.) in 1851.

Congress 
Russell was elected as a Democrat to the 35th United States Congress, holding office from March 4, 1857, to March 3, 1859.

Later career 
He was appointed as Naval Officer of the Port of New York City in 1859, and he served until 1861.  (U.S. ports were run by three political appointees—the collector, naval officer (or navy agent) and surveyor.  These individuals were responsible for assessing customs duties on incoming cargo and ensuring payment to the Department of the Treasury.  Because they were paid a percentage of duties collected as well as a portion of the fines levied for attempting to evade customs, and because employees of the customs houses were political party loyalists who were expected to contribute to their party, the collector, naval officer and surveyor positions were sought after political plums.)

After leaving the Naval Officer's post Russell returned to his banking business.

Death and burial 
He died in Saugerties, New York on April 29, 1896. He was interred in Mountain View Cemetery.

Sources

1812 births
1896 deaths
Democratic Party members of the New York State Assembly
People from Saugerties, New York
Democratic Party members of the United States House of Representatives from New York (state)
19th-century American politicians